South East Asian Federation of Organizations for Medical Physics (SEAFOMP) was officially formed when it was accepted as a regional chapter of the International Organization for Medical Physics (IOMP) at the World Congress on Medical Physics and Biomedical Engineering, held in Chicago, Illinois, in 2000.

The founding member countries of SEAFOMP were Indonesia, Malaysia, Philippines, Singapore and Thailand. Two other ASEAN countries joined SEAFOMP later in 2002 (Brunei) and 2005 (Vietnam).

SEAFOMP was established with the primary aim of helping to raise the profile of medical physics, via education and training, in ASEAN. The objectives of SEAFOMP are to promote (i) cooperation and communication between medical physics organizations in the region; (ii) medical physics and related activities in the region; (iii) the advancement in status and standard of practice of the medical physics profession; (iv) to organize and/or sponsor international and regional conferences, meetings or courses; (v) to collaborate or affiliate with other scientific organizations.

Since then the initiative has been supported by many international organisations, including the American Association of Physicists in Medicine (AAPM), International Organization for Medical Physics (IOMP), International Atomic Energy Agency (IAEA), World Health Organization (WHO), and International Center for Theoretical Physics (ICTP). The support is primarily financial, via provisions of co-sponsorship of workshops and conferences, travel grants, medical physics libraries programs, and research experts and educators for educational activities.

SEAFOMP has organised a series of congresses to promote scientific exchange and mutual support among its members. The South East Asian Congress for Medical Physics (SEACOMP) series were held respectively in Malaysia (Kuala Lumpur, 2001 and 2004), Thailand (Bangkok, 2003; Chiang Mai, 2009), Indonesia (Jakarta, 2006; Bandung, 2010), The Philippines (Manila, 2007; Manila & Bohol, 2011) and Vietnam (Ho Chi Minh City, 2008).

It also has adopted Biomedical Imaging and Intervention Journal as its official publication.

See also
SEAFOMP Website
Biomedical Imaging and Intervention Journal

References

Medical physics organizations
International organizations based in Asia